The Qinghai Provincial Library, also known as the Qinghai Library, is a Xining-based large scale comprehensive public library, located at No. 66, Xiguan Street, Chengxi District, Xining City.

History
The predecessor of the Qinghai Provincial Library was the Qinghai Province-established Library,  which was built in 1934 and officially opened on 15 April 1935.

References

Libraries in China
Buildings and structures in Qinghai
Libraries established in 1934